Sannat Lions F.C. is a Maltese football club from the village of Sannat, Gozo. The club was founded in 1937 and is currently playing in the Gozo Football League First Division. 

The Lions' heyday was in the mid-1970s and early 1980s in which the Lions won 5 championships in 7 years and established many records, where even at one stage they went over 2 seasons without tasting any defeat. Recent years have seen the Lions shifting between the two Gozitan divisions.

Recent seasons

The Malta Football Referees Association has criticised a court ruling that condemned Sannat Lions player Antoine Camilleri to a €100 fine, a one-year ban from entering a football ground after he assaulted a referee during Saturday's GFA Division Two match at the Kerċem Stadium.

Camilleri attacked assistant referee Andrea Pavia in the dying minutes of Saturday's match between Sannat Lions and Oratory Youths, after he was just sent off for a second bookable offence.

Camilleri pleaded guilty on Sunday to charges of threatening and slightly injuring a person as well as threatening at attacking another person, breaching the peace and using offensive language.

The MFRA opened its statement by thanking the Malta Football Association for the support it showed and believes that the local governing body of football's disciplinary body will do what the Gozo Court failed on Sunday, "to hand Camilleri a ban that he duly deserves."

"The committee of the MFRA is ordering its members, who amount to almost a 100 per cent of the officials present in Maltese football, to dismiss any appointment of matches where Antoine Camilleri could play once his suspension comes to an end," the MFRA said.

"The behaviour of some of the Sannat Lions FC fans during this attack was also unacceptable after they were seen throwing beer and spitting at the official who was grounded after the attack.

"Hours after this attack, the match officials continued to receive threatening messages on social media. Therefore, in a sign of solidarity with the game officials, the MFRA committee is ordering its members not to officiate matches involving Sannat Lions with immediate effect.

"These directives will remain into effect until the MFRA issues other instructions."

The team finished the 2006–07 championship in second place, losing the decisive final encounter with Nadur Youngsters 2–1 in a game where a draw would have sufficed to win their first championship in 17 years. The team was not able to challenge seriously in 2007–08 finishing 15 points behind Nadur Youngsters in third place, however in the 2008–09 season they finally won their first league title in 19 years, as they finished first in front of Għajnsielem.

In the 2009–2010 season, despite high hopes of retaining the title, the team struggled and finished the league in 6th place. This necessitated a play-off against Second Division runners-up Xagħra United to maintain their top-flight status, which was ascertained with a 3–0 win. The season was redeemed by the GFA Cup triumph in the final with a 2–1 victory in extra time over Kerċem Ajax after a semi-final in which the Lions came back from 3–0 and 4–1 down and two sending-offs to draw 4–4 against holders SK Victoria Wanderers and then eliminate them 6–5 on penalties.

After a difficult 2009–2010 season, Sannat reinforced their playing squad by signing some of the best local talent and went on to win the First Division title for their 10th time in their history. Along, they also won the Jum il-Helsien cup and also the 3rd most prestigious trophy 'The Super Cup'.

Despite a memorable 2010–2011 season, the subsequent season saw some departures and the club decided to give some of their youth a chance. This was a mixed season for the Greens as they produced some very good and bad performances. The Lions survived the drop in the last match of the season where a win against Xaghra United saw them attain 5th place safely.

Squad

Achievements

First Division League
Winners (10): 1975–76, 1976–77, 1977–78, 1980–81, 1981–82, 1986–87, 1987–88, 1989–90, 2008–09, 2010–11
Runners-up (10): 1974–75, 1978–79, 1979–80, 1982–83, 1983–84, 1985–86, 1988–89, 1992–93, 1998–99, 2006–07

Gozo FA Cup
Winners (9): 1974–75, 1975–76, 1976–77, 1977–78, 1978–79, 1980–81, 1981–82, 1982–83, 2009–2010
Runners-up (7): 1973–74, 1987–88, 1989–90, 1993–94, 1995–96, 1999–00, 2010–11

First Division League
Winners (1): 1997–98

Second Division
Winners (6): 1966–67, 1973–74, 2000–01, 2002–03, 2004–05, 2019-20.
Runners-up (5): 1953–54, 1964–65, 1970–71, 1972–73, 2013–2014

Super Cup
Winners (2): 2008–2009, 2010–2011
Runners-up (1): 2009–2010

Independence Cup
Winners (2): 1996–97, 1998–99
Runners-up (4): 1987–88, 1989–90, 1995–96, 2003–04, 2009–2010

Jum il-Ħelsien Cup
Winners (5): 1978–79, 1979–80, 1980–81, 1981–82, 1997–98, 2010–2011
Runners-up (1): 2008–2009

Farsons Tournament
Winners (3): 1977–78, 1978–79, 1979–8

Republic Cup
Winners (4): 1975–76, 1976–77, 1977–78, 1978–79

British American Cup: 3
Winners (3): 1969–70, 1970–71, 1972–73
Runners-up (1): 1971–72

Gemaharija Cup
Winners (1): 1991–92

Rothmans First Division Cup
Winners (1): 1987–88

Second Division Cup
Winners (1): 1969–70
Runners-up (1): 2002–03

First-Second Division promotion/relegation play-off
Winners (1): 2013–2014

External links
Official website

Football clubs in Malta
Gozitan football clubs
1937 establishments in Malta
Sannat